Certain Things Are Likely is the third studio album by English pop band Kissing the Pink, released in 1986 by Magnet Records. Kissing the Pink co-produced the majority of the album with frequent collaborator Peter Walsh at various notable studios in Southern England (as well as one in Munich, Germany). Magnet Records remixed most of the album in an attempt to make the album sound more commercial, using Phil Harding, which at the time Nick Whitecross explained "this record is like a ticket for us to go to as many people as possible". The album continued to express similar themes and values in their lyrics found on their previous albums, such as their deadpan surrealist humor and mordantly satirical social commentary.

The album peaked at No. 93 in Australia, and the singles from the album got good airplay, allowing them to release one subsequent non-album single in 1988, "Stand Up (Get Down)", before being dropped from the label, meaning that Certain Things Are Likely would become Kissing the Pink's last studio album for seven years, until 1993's Sugarland, despite their various unsuccessful attempts to release music in the interim.

A remixed version of the album's title track "Certain Things Are Likely" was a No. 1 hit on the US Dance Club charts in 1987 but it did not chart in their homeland. "One Step", while only reaching No. 79 on the UK Singles Chart, was performed on Top of the Pops, and was also a success on the US Dance Club charts, peaking at No. 5. It also reached the Top 40 in Belgium, and the Netherlands. "Never Too Late to Love You", the least successful single from the album peaked at No. 32 on the US Dance Club charts but would later prove to be their final single to chart in the UK, peaking at No. 87.

Following the departure of founding members including second keyboardist George Stewart, saxophonist Josephine Wells, and violinist Peter Barnett, Certain Things Are Likely marked the first time that the band had had any other musicians but their own members playing on an album, and it features a variety of guest musicians on the album, including Matt Aitken (of Stock Aitken Waterman) providing additional guitar on the track "No-One's on the Same Side", whilst Derek Forbes (formerly of Simple Minds) provides additional bass on two tracks, "Dream, Dream", and "Jones". Chaz Jankel of Ian Dury and the Blockheads also provides additional bass on the final track of the album, "I Won't Wait". The album also features an array of backing vocalists, including Judy Cheeks.

After its original release, the album remained out of print on any format for many years. However, the album became available in 2012 via online MP3 download on major sites such as Amazon, and iTunes. This digital release included two bonus tracks, a 12" extended mix of "One Step", and a 7" radio mix of "Certain Things Are Likely".

Critical reception

In a retrospective review for AllMusic, critic Michael Sutton wrote of the album, "Kissing the Pink's Certain Things Are Likely is generally considered by Kissing the Pink fans to be the group's weakest LP. And they're right", adding that the album "sounds as if the band was trying hard to produce a hit."

Track listing

Personnel
Credits are adapted from the Certain Things Are Likely liner notes.

Kissing the Pink
 Nicholas Whitecross – lead vocals; guitar
 Jon Kingsley Hall – keyboards; vocals
 Simon Aldridge – guitar; vocals
 Stephen Cusack – drums; vocals

Additional musicians
 Matt Aitken – additional guitar 
 Alistair Fraser – bagpipes 
 Philip Bagenal – additional keyboards 
 Derek Forbes – additional bass on 
 Andy Pasque – additional bass on 
 Alan Taylor – additional bass on 
 Chaz Jankel – additional bass on 
 Judy Cheeks – backing vocals 
 Victoria Miles – backing vocals 
 Scarlett Von Wollenman – backing vocals 
 The Lewis Sisters – backing vocals

Charts

References

External links
 

1986 albums
Kissing the Pink albums
Albums produced by Peter Walsh